Chub Tarash may refer to:

Chub Tarash, Lorestan
Chub Tarash Mian Golal, Lorestan
Chub Tarash, West Azerbaijan